Nathalie Dechy was the defending champion, but lost in semifinals to Nadia Petrova.

Ai Sugiyama won the title by defeating Nadia Petrova 1–6, 6–1, 6–4 in the final.

Seeds
The first two seeds received a bye into the second round.

Draw

Finals

Top half

Bottom half

External links
 ITF results archive
 WTA results archive

2004 WTA Tour